Abdelaziz „Aziz“ Ahanfouf (born 14 January 1978) is a German-Moroccan former professional footballer who played as a striker.

Career
Ahanfouf was born in Germany and has played professionally for several German clubs. He joined Arminia Bielefeld from MSV Duisburg at the start of the 2006–07 season. He played for Bielefeld until December 2007, when he suffered a serious injury as a result of a car accident.

Ahanfouf signed a three and a half year contract with Wehen in January 2008.

References

External links
 
 
 

Living people
1978 births
Association football forwards
Citizens of Morocco through descent
German sportspeople of African descent
Moroccan footballers
Morocco international footballers
SpVgg Unterhaching players
Kickers Offenbach players
FC Hansa Rostock players
1. FSV Mainz 05 players
Dynamo Dresden players
MSV Duisburg players
Arminia Bielefeld players
SV Wehen Wiesbaden players
Chabab Rif Al Hoceima players
SV Darmstadt 98 players
Bundesliga players
2. Bundesliga players
Riffian people
German people of Moroccan descent